Kanniyin Sabatham is a 1958 Indian Tamil-language film directed by T. R. Raghunath and produced by M. Somasundaram and A. L. Srinivasan. The film stars K. R. Ramasamy, Anjali Devi and M. N. Nambiar.

Plot

Cast 
Adapted from the database of Film News Anandan:

Male cast
 K. R. Ramasamy
 M. N. Nambiar
 K. A. Thangavelu
 T. S. Durairaj
 Javar Seetharaman
Female cast
 Anjali Devi
 M. N. Rajam
 Rajasulochana
 Sandhya

Production 
Kanniyin Sabatham was directed by T. R. Raghunath and was produced by M. Somasundaram and A. L. Srinivasan under the banner Jupiter Productions. Sadasiva Brahmam and A. K. Velan wrote the story while the dialogues were written by Kannadasan. Editing was handled by K. Govindasamy. Saiyad Ahamed was in charge of art direction. Still photography was done by Venkatachari and the film was made at Neptune and Revathi studios.

Soundtrack 
The music was composed by T. G. Lingappa while the lyrics were penned by Thanjai N. Ramaiah Dass, Kannadasan, Pattukkottai Kalyanasundaram and A. Maruthakasi.

Track listing

Release 
Kanniyin Sabatham was released on 10 January 1958. It received a "U" (universal) certificate from the CBFC after seven cuts.

References

External links 

1950s Tamil-language films
Films directed by T. R. Raghunath
Films scored by T. G. Lingappa
Indian black-and-white films